Queen Uihye of the Yeongheung Choi clan was the biological mother of Yi Seong-gye, the founder of the Joseon dynasty and the primary wife of his father, Yi Ja-chun. By her grandson, Taejong of Joseon's order, she then posthumously elevated her rank into a queen consort in 1411.

Biography

Early life
The future Queen Uihye was born into the Yeongheung Choi clan as the daughter of the Korean chiliarch of the Yuan dynasty called Choi Han-gi, the Duke Jeonghyo and Internal Prince Yeongheung (영흥부원군 정효공 최한기, 永興府院君 靖孝公 崔閑奇) and Grand Lady Yi of Joseon State (조선국대부인 이씨, 朝鮮國大夫人 李氏). Her family name, along with that of her father Jo-Jo's, was originally from the Jo clan.

But once her father was named a Korean chiliarch of the Yuan dynasty, he changed his name to Choi Han-gi. Her family long resided ever since in today's Anbyon County, Gangwon Province in North Korea, which was once called Deungju (Korean: 등주; Hanja: 登州) during the Goryeo dynasty. Having become very wealthy by saving a lot of money, her family were known to be rich amongst the local population.

Youth life
It was said that from young, Lady Choi was intelligent and had many unusual things. When her parents reached the age of poverty, they wanted her to married Kim-Rin (김린, 金麟)'s son, but when she did not listen, they offered to divide the household goods in half. Knowing this, Choi cried sadly and said, "How can someone unexpectedly marry Kim-Rin's son when they are born into this world and have a great relationship?, a matchmaker will come soon.” (사람이 세상에 태어나서 큰 인연이 있는데 어찌 뜻밖에 김린의 아들에게 시집갈 수 있겠는가. 배필이 곧 이를 것이다).

Marriage with Yi Jachun and death
Then, Yi Jachun went to Choi Han-gi's house on business, when she had a good dream that two dragons came down from the sky, one went into her stomach and the other stood in the yard. Since they meet each other in there, Yi then proposed Lady Choi and they were married. During her lifetime after married, Lady Choi more commonly called as Grand Lady of Three Han State (삼한국대부인, 三韓國大夫人). She then bore Yi 1 son (Yi Seong-gye) and 1 daughter (Princess Jeonghwa). However, she died before Joseon dynasty established.

Later life
After Yi Seong-gye made the new Joseon dynasty, she then elevated her rank into Consort Ui (의비, 懿妃) by him as her Posthumous name. In the following year, by her grandson, King Yi Bang-won's order, she was Posthumously honoured as Queen Consort Uihye (의혜왕후, 懿惠王后).

Tomb and funeral
The Queen was buried in Hwareung Tomb (화릉, 和陵), Dongheung-ri, Hamheung-si, Hamgyeongnam-do, adjacent from her husband in Jeongneung Tomb.

In 1471 (2nd year reign of Seongjong of Joseon), her funeral was held in Yeongnyeong Hall (영녕전, 永寧殿) and in 1795 (19th year reign of Jeongjo of Joseon), her veneration was held again in Yeongheung Palace (영흥본궁, 永興本宮).

Family 
 Great-Grandfather
 Choi Cheon-bo (최천보, 崔天甫)
 Great-Grandmother 
 Grand Lady Kim of Joseon  Stat (조선국대부인 김씨, 朝鮮國大夫人 金氏)
 Grandfather 
 Choi Jung-dae (최종대, 崔終大)
 Grandmother 
 Princess Hwasan, Grand Lady Kim of Joseon State (화산군부인 조선국대부인 김씨, 花山郡夫人 朝鮮國大夫人 金氏)
 Father 
 Internal Prince Yeongheung, Duke Jeonghyo, Choi Han-gi (증 영흥부원군 정효공 최한기, 贈 永興府院君 靖孝公 崔閑奇)
 Mother 
 Princess Consort Hongwon, Grand Lady Yi of Joseon State (증 홍원군부인 조선국대부인 이씨, 贈 洪原郡夫人 朝鮮國大夫人 李氏)
 Siblings 
 Older sister – Princess Consort Yeongheung of the Yeongheung Choi clan (영흥군부인 최씨, 永興郡夫人 崔氏)
 Brother-in-law – Jeon Suk (전석, 全碩)
 Younger sister – Princess Gyeongchang of the Yeongheung Choi clan (경창옹주 최씨, 慶昌翁主 崔氏)
 Brother-in-law – Seok Yang-seon (석양선, 石良善)
 Nephew – Seok Cheon-eul (석천을, 石天乙)
 Husband
 Yi Ja-chun, Hwanjo of Joseon (조선 환조) (1315 – 3 May 1360)
 Father-in-law – Yi Chun, Dojo of Joseon (조선 도조) (? – 1342)
 Mother-in-law – Queen Gyeongsun of the Munju Park clan (경순왕후 문주 박씨)
 Issue
 Son – Yi Seong-gye, Taejo of Joseon (조선 태조) (27 October 1335 – 18 June 1408)
 Daughter-in-law – Queen Sinui of the Anbyeon Han clan (September 1337 – 21 October 1391) (신의왕후 한씨)
 Grandson – Yi Bang-u, Grand Prince Jinan (1354 – 15 January 1394) (이방우 진안대군)
 Grandson – Yi Bang-gwa, Grand Prince Yeongan (18 July 1357 – 15 October 1419) (이방과 영안대군)
 Grandson – Yi Bang-ui, Grand Prince Ikan (1360 – 26 September 1404) (이방의 익안대군)
 Grandson – Yi Bang-gan, Grand Prince Hoean (2 July 1364 – 10 April 1421) (이방간 회안대군)
 Grandson – Yi Bang-won, Grand Prince Jeongan (13 June 1367 – 30 May 1422) (이방원 정안대군)
 Grandson – Yi Bang-yeon, Grand Prince Deokan (이방연 덕안대군)
 Granddaughter – Princess Gyeongsin (? – 29 April 1426) (경신공주)
 Granddaughter – Princess Gyeongseon (경선공주)
 Daughter-in-law – Queen Sindeok of the Goksan Kang clan (12 July 1356 – 15 September 1396) (신덕왕후 강씨)
 Granddaughter – Princess Gyeongsun (? – 8 September 1407) (경순공주)
 Grandson – Yi Bang-beon, Grand Prince Muan (1381 – 6 October 1398) (이방번 무안대군)
 Grandson – Yi Bang-seok, Grand Prince Uian (1382 – 6 October 1398) (이방석 의안대군)
 Daughter – Princess Jeonghwa (정화공주)
 Son-in-law – Jo In-byeok (조인벽, 趙仁璧) (1328–1393)
 Step-Grandson – Jo On (조온, 趙溫) (1347–1417)
 Step granddaughter-in-law – Grand Lady Jang of Byeonhan State (변한국대부인 장씨, 卞韓國大夫人 張氏)
 Step granddaughter-in-law – Grand Lady Park of Byeonhan State (변한국대부인 박씨, 卞韓國大夫人 朴氏)
 Grandson – Jo Yeon (조연, 趙涓) (1374–1429)
 Granddaughter-in-law – Grand Lady Kim of Byeonhan State (변한국대부인 김씨, 卞韓國大夫人 金氏) (1374–1455)
 Grandson – Jo Hu (조후, 趙候) (1377–1444)
 Grandson – Jo Sa (조사, 趙師) (? – 1432)
 Grandson – Jo Jeon (조전, 趙傳)
 Grandson – Jo Bo (조보, 趙保)
 Grandson – Jo Baek (조백, 趙伯)
 Granddaughter – Lady Jo of the Hanyang Jo clan (한양 조씨, 漢陽 趙氏)
 Grandson-in-law – Hwang Gil-won (황길원, 黃吉源)
 Granddaughter – Lady Jo of the Hanyang Jo clan (한양 조씨, 漢陽 趙氏)
 Grandson-in-law – Im Maeng-yang (임맹양, 林孟陽)

References

Yuan dynasty people
14th-century Korean people
Royal consorts of the Joseon dynasty
Korean queens consort
People from South Hamgyong
14th-century Korean women